Juniperus horizontalis, the creeping juniper or creeping cedar, is a low-growing shrubby juniper native to northern North America, throughout most of Canada from Yukon east to Newfoundland, and in some of the northern United States.

Description
The shoots are slender,  diameter. The leaves are arranged in opposite decussate pairs, or occasionally in whorls of three; the adult leaf blades are scale-like, 1–2 mm long (to 8 mm on lead shoots) and  broad, and derive from an adnate petiole. The cones are berry-like, globose to bilobed,  in diameter, dark blue with a pale blue-white waxy bloom, and contain two seeds (rarely one or three); they usually have a curved stem and are mature in about 18 months. It is dioecious, producing cones of only one sex on each plant.

It is closely related to Juniperus virginiana, and often hybridizes with it where their ranges meet in southern Canada. Hybrids with Juniperus scopulorum also occur.

Distribution and habitat
The species is native to northern North America, throughout most of Canada from Yukon east to Newfoundland, and in the United States in Alaska, and continentally from Montana east to Maine, reaching its furthest south in Wyoming and northern Illinois. Amongst the sites it occupies are rocky areas of the east slopes of the Rocky Mountains.

Cultivation and uses
Well over 100 different cultivars have been selected for use as ornamental plants in gardens, their strictly prostrate growth habit being valued for ground cover. Popular examples include 'Bar Harbor', 'Blue Acres', 'Emerald Spreader', 'Green Acres', and 'Wiltonii' ("Blue Rug Juniper"). Many of the most popular cultivars have strikingly glaucous foliage, while others are bright green, yellowish or variegated.

Gallery

References

Further reading 
Adams, R. P. (2004). Junipers of the World: The genus Juniperus. Trafford Publishing

External links
  USDA Plants Profile for Juniperus horizontalis (creeping juniper)
 Gymnosperm Database: Juniperus horizontalis
 Flora of North America: Juniperus horizontalis
 Plantmaps.com: Interactive Distribution Map of Juniperus horizontalis
  Lady Bird Johnson Wildflower Center, NPIN Database: Juniperus horizontalis (Creeping juniper,  Creeping savin)

horizontalis
Flora of Subarctic America
Flora of Canada
Flora of the North-Central United States
Flora of the Northeastern United States
Flora of the Great Lakes region (North America)
Flora of Montana
Dioecious plants
Least concern flora of North America
Least concern flora of the United States
Garden plants of North America
Groundcovers
Plants described in 1794